Colin Patterson may refer to:

Colin Patterson (ice hockey) (born 1960), former ice hockey player in the National Hockey League
Colin Patterson (rugby union) (born 1955), former Ireland international rugby union player
Colin Patterson (biologist) (1933–1998), British palaeontologist